Watson Spring is a spring in Oregon County in the Ozarks of southern Missouri.

Watson Spring has the name of Samuel Watson, a pioneer citizen.

References

Bodies of water of Oregon County, Missouri
Springs of Missouri